Wittmackia incompta is a species of plant in the family Bromeliaceae. This species is endemic to the State of Bahia in eastern Brazil.

Cultivars
 Aechmea 'Tingua'

References

incompta
Flora of Brazil
Plants described in 1999